The 2021–22 season was the 123rd season in the existence of SC Freiburg and the club's sixth consecutive season in the top flight of German football. In addition to the domestic league, SC Freiburg participated in this season's edition of the DFB-Pokal.

Players

First-team squad

Out on loan

Transfers

In

Out

Pre-season and friendlies

Competitions

Overall record

Bundesliga

League table

Results summary

Results by round

Matches
The league fixtures were announced on 25 June 2021.

DFB-Pokal

Statistics

Appearances and goals

|-
! colspan=14 style=background:#dcdcdc; text-align:center| Goalkeepers

|-
! colspan=14 style=background:#dcdcdc; text-align:center| Defenders 

|-
! colspan=14 style=background:#dcdcdc; text-align:center| Midfielders 

|-
! colspan=14 style=background:#dcdcdc; text-align:center| Forwards

|-
! colspan=14 style=background:#dcdcdc; text-align:center| Players transferred out during the season

Goalscorers

Last updated: 21 May 2022

References

SC Freiburg seasons
SC Freiburg